Kamensky is a rural locality (a khutor) in Novogrigoryevskoye Rural Settlement, Ilovlinsky District, Volgograd Oblast, Russia. The population was 46 as of 2010.

Geography 
Kamensky is located on the Don River, on south of Volga Upland, 47 km northwest of Ilovlya (the district's administrative centre) by road. Novogrigoryevskaya is the nearest rural locality.

References 

Rural localities in Ilovlinsky District